Mehrabadi is a neighborhood on the outskirts of Islamabad, the capital of Pakistan. It has a mixed population that includes a substantial number of people from the country's Christian minority. It is located near sector G-11 of the city.

In August 2012, it was the location of the controversial arrest of 14-year-old girl, Rimsha Masih, on blasphemy charges. The resulting inter-communal tensions caused most of the Christian inhabitants of the area to flee to other parts of the city.  many had begun to return to their homes in the area.

See also
 Mira Jafar

References 

Islamabad
Villages in Islamabad Capital Territory